Tibor Takács may refer to:

Tibor Takács (canoeist), Hungarian sprint canoeist 
Tibor Takács (director) (born 1954), Hungarian-Canadian director